The following television and radio stations serve the city of Topeka, Kansas, and surrounding areas.

Television
Topeka is the 133rd largest television media market in the United States (as ranked by Nielsen). The following is a list of television stations licensed to and/or broadcast from the city.

According to Arbitron, the following Kansas counties are part of Topeka's DMA:  Brown, Clay, Cloud, Coffey, Geary, Jackson, Jefferson, Lyon, Marshall, Morris, Nemaha, Osage, Pottawatomie, Riley, Shawnee, Wabaunsee, Washington,

Radio
Topeka is the 194th largest radio market (as determined by Arbitron).  Several radio stations cover the Topeka area, including:

FM radio

1 KMAJ has a construction permit to construct a new tower in Shawnee.  Upon completion, Majic 107.7 will broadcast from there instead of Topeka, the current city of license.

AM radio

Market overlap
Several more stations from the Kansas City metropolitan area broadcast into Topeka.  Most of Kansas City's stations are among those gauged in Aribtron's semi-annual surveys.

Many Topeka stations also penetrate into the eastern counties of the Wichita media market, notably Saline County, which contains Salina, and the counties around Salina.

References

External links
Kansas City radio and TV - detailed histories of radio and television frequencies in Topeka, Kansas City, St. Joseph, and Lawrence

Topeka

Mass media in Kansas